Roy Leslie Austin (born 1939) is a former United States Ambassador to Trinidad and Tobago October 2001 to December 2009.

Biography
Born in Kingstown, Saint Vincent and the Grenadines, he moved to the United States to study and later became a U.S. citizen.  He attended Yale University and graduated with a Bachelor of Arts in sociology. While there he befriended future U.S. President George W. Bush and both were inducted to the secret society Skull and Bones. He earned a Master of Arts and Ph.D. in sociology from the University of Washington.

Austin was Associate Professor of Sociology, Justice, and African American Studies at Pennsylvania State University and served as director of the Crime, Law, and Justice Program and the Africana Research Center.

Bush appointed Austin to the post of Ambassador to Trinidad and Tobago. He was sworn in October 19, 2001. He left the post on December 18, 2009.

Personal life

In 1967, Austin married Glynis Josephine Sutherland.  They have three children, Roy L. Austin, Jr., Roger Austin, and Deborah Austin Depay.  Austin's eldest son, Roy Jr., served as a Deputy Assistant to President Barack Obama leading the White House Office of Urban Affairs, Justice, and Opportunity.

References

External links

 US Department of State bio

1939 births
Yale College alumni
Ambassadors of the United States to Trinidad and Tobago
Saint Vincent and the Grenadines emigrants to the United States
Living people
People from Kingstown
Pennsylvania State University faculty
University of Washington College of Arts and Sciences alumni
African-American diplomats
21st-century African-American people
20th-century African-American people